Gevra Road railway station is a small terminal railway station in Korba district, Chhattisgarh, India. Its code is GAD. It serves the Korba Coalfield area. The station consists of 3 platforms. The platform is not well sheltered. It lacks many facilities such as water and sanitation.

Major trains 
 Bilaspur–Gevra Passenger (unreserved)
 Bilaspur–Gevra Road MEMU
 Raipur–Gevra Road MEMU
 Raipur–Gevra Road Passenger (unreserved)
 Shivnath Express
 Gevra Road–Nagpur Express
 Chhattisgarh Express
 Hasdeo Antyodaya Express (only from 24/01/2019 – 02/02/2019)(now discontinued)

References

Railway junction stations in India
Railway stations in Korba district
Bilaspur railway division
2013 establishments in Chhattisgarh
Transport in Korba, Chhattisgarh